Adrian Movileanu (born September 4, 1993) is a Romanian professional basketball player for BCM Olimpic Baia Mare of the Romanian League.

References

1993 births
Living people
CSU Asesoft Ploiești players
Sportspeople from Ploiești
Romanian men's basketball players
Small forwards